Saint-Sévère is a parish municipality in the Mauricie region of the province of Quebec in Canada.

Demographics 

References

External links

Parish municipalities in Quebec
Incorporated places in Mauricie